Ramus can refer to: 
 A branch (botany)
 A portion of a bone (from Latin ramus, "branch"), as in the Ramus of the mandible or Superior pubic ramus
 A nerve ramus such as the Dorsal ramus of spinal nerve
 A taxonomic rank ("branch" in English) intermediate between subkingdom and infrakingdom
 Webster, Illinois, a settlement initially known as "Ramus"
People:
 Edmond Ramus (1822–1890), French engraver best known for his copies of paintings for art catalogues
 Petrus Ramus (1515–1572), influential French humanist, logician, and educational reformer
 Tetyana Ramus (born 1980) Ukrainian artist, designer, TV and radio journalist, public activist, producer, publisher, author of television projects